Betty Lou Beets (March 12, 1937 – February 24, 2000) was a murderer executed in the U.S. state of Texas. She was convicted of shooting her fifth husband, Jimmy Don Beets, on August 6, 1983.

Early life
Born Betty Lou Dunevant to Margaret Louise Smithwick (April 20, 1917 – June 16, 1993) and James Garland Dunevant (September 15, 1912 – February 14, 2003), she was born in Roxboro, North Carolina, on March 12, 1937. 
Beets was deaf due to a childhood bout with measles, and claimed she was sexually abused by her father.

When Beets was a child, the family moved from North Carolina to Hampton, Virginia, where her father was employed as a machinist at the Langley Research Center. 

Her mother was institutionalized when she was 12 years old, leaving her to take care of her younger sister and brother.

Marriages
Beets married her first husband, Robert Franklin Branson, at age 15, and according to her supporters, all of her marriages were plagued with sexual abuse and domestic violence, which Beets cited only well after her conviction and sentence of death.

Beets had a criminal history prior to her arrest for murder, including public lewdness, and shooting former husband Bill Lane in the side of the abdomen. Married six times, twice to the same man (Bill York Lane), Beets shot Lane twice in the back in 1970; she was acquitted after Lane admitted he had threatened her life first and the two remarried, divorcing again a month later. She later tried to run over her third husband, Ronnie C. Threlkold, with her car in 1978. Both men survived and testified at her murder trial.

Crime

On August 6, 1983, Beets reported her fifth husband, Jimmy Don Beets, missing from their home near Cedar Creek Lake in Henderson County, Texas. Her son, Robert Branson, later testified that Betty Lou Beets had said that she intended to kill her husband, and told her son to leave the house. On returning to the house two hours later, he found Jimmy Don Beets dead with two gunshot wounds. He helped his mother conceal the body below ground in the front yard of the house, after which Betty Lou Beets telephoned the police.

According to her son, Beets put some of Jimmy Don's heart medication in his fishing boat the next day. Branson and Beets then abandoned the boat in the lake. It was found on August 12, 1983, washed ashore near the Redwood Beach Marina. Believing that he had fallen overboard and drowned, the police spent three weeks dragging the lake looking for Jimmy Don's body.

In 1985, information was received by the Henderson County Sheriff that led to enough evidence to arrest Beets for the August 6 murder. After a search warrant was issued, a search of Beets's home found the remains of Jimmy Don in a filled-in wishing well. Also found buried in a garage were the remains of Doyle Wayne Barker, her fourth husband. Both had been shot with a .38 caliber pistol. She was never tried for Barker's murder. She was sentenced to death by lethal injection.

Trial and procedural history

Her trial for the murder for remuneration and the promise of remuneration of Jimmy Don Beets began on July 11, 1985, in the 173rd district court of Henderson County. She pleaded not guilty, claiming that two of her children had committed the murders. She was found guilty on October 11. The evidence of abuse was never presented to the court. During the separate penalty phase three days later, she was sentenced to death. Beets was Texas Department of Criminal Justice Death Row # 810. She was received by the Texas Department of Corrections on October 14, 1985. She was incarcerated in the Mountain View Unit.

An automatic appeal to the Texas Court of Criminal Appeals first overturned the conviction, saying that insurance and pension benefits were not the same as remuneration. The state requested a rehearing on September 21, 1988; this time, the Court ruled the conviction and sentence should stand. Ten years of appeals followed. The Supreme Court of the United States denied a writ of certiorari on June 26, 1989, and an execution date was set for November 8. On November 1, she received a stay from the trial court after she filed a state habeas petition. The Court of Criminal Appeals denied this request on June 27, 1990, leading to a second execution date of December 6.

A federal petition for a writ of habeas corpus was filed three days before her scheduled execution, and the federal district court granted a stay of execution on December 4. Throughout the first half of 1991, evidentiary hearings were held, and on May 9 the court granted relief on one of Beets's claims, but denied all others. The United States Court of Appeals upheld the decision on March 18, 1993, and also overturned the one claim that had been granted relief. The case was sent to a federal district court, and on September 2, 1998, it denied her habeas corpus relief. After her appeals were denied throughout 1999, an execution date was set for February 24, 2000.

Execution

Beets was executed by lethal injection at 6:18 pm CST on February 24, 2000, in the Huntsville Unit. She did not request a final meal, nor did she make a final statement. Beets was the second woman executed in the state after the reintroduction of the death penalty. At the time of the execution, she was 62 years old, and had five children, nine grandchildren, and six great-grandchildren. Like most executed criminals, Beets was cremated after her death. Her ashes were scattered over her mother's grave.

Media
Betty Lou Beets' crimes were retold by her daughter, Shirley Furgala, as part of an episode of the TV series Evil Lives Here on September 13, 2020.

See also

 Capital punishment in Texas
 Capital punishment in the United States
 List of people executed in Texas, 2000–2009
 List of people executed in the United States in 2000
 List of women executed in the United States since 1976

References

External links
Offender information from the Texas Department of Criminal Justice
Last statement from the Texas Department of Criminal Justice
Last meals from The Memory Hole
Clark County Prosecutor
What my husband started Texas will finish

1937 births
2000 deaths
1983 murders in the United States
20th-century executions by Texas
20th-century executions of American people
20th-century American women
American female murderers
American people executed for murder
Executed American women
Executed people from North Carolina
Mariticides
People convicted of murder by Texas
People executed by Texas by lethal injection
People from Hampton, Virginia
People from Henderson County, Texas
People from Roxboro, North Carolina
Violence against men in North America